William and Mary is an ITV romantic drama set in London, England, starring Martin Clunes as William Shawcross, an undertaker, and Julie Graham as Mary Gilcrest, a midwife.  Its title refers to its two principal characters and is a cultural reference to the reign of the British monarchs William III and Mary II. It was shown in three six-part series in 2003–2005. It was also screened on Seven's best of-Scottish and English-oriented 7TWO.

Main cast
 Martin Clunes - William Shawcross (18 episodes, 2003–2005)
 Julie Graham - Mary Gilcrest (18 episodes, 2003–2005)
 Cheryl Campbell - Molly Gilcrest Straud (18 episodes, 2003–2005)
 Michael Begley - Rick Straud (18 episodes, 2003–2005)
 Claire Hackett - Doris (18 episodes, 2003–2005)
 Peta Cornish - Kate Shawcross (18 episodes, 2003–2005)
 Ricci McLeod - Brendan Gilcrest (18 episodes, 2003–2005)
 Dominick Baron - Terence Gilcrest (18 episodes, 2003–2005)
 Georgina Terry - Julia Shawcross (18 episodes, 2003–2005)
 James Greene - Arnold McKinnon (17 episodes, 2003–2005)
 June Watson - Mrs. Ball (16 episodes, 2003–2005)
 Catherine Terris - Jane Spalding (15 episodes, 2003–2005)
 David Kennedy - Billy Two Hats (14 episodes, 2003–2005)
 The Emerald Dogs - The Band (11 episodes, 2003–2005)
 Paterson Joseph - Reuben (10 episodes, 2003–2005)
 Max and Harvey Mills as Thomas (6 episodes, 2005)
 Peter Pacey - Nicholas (3 episodes, 2003–2004)

Episodes

The story revolves around William Shawcross and Mary Gilcrest, along with William's two daughters Kate and Julia, Mary's two sons Brendan and Terence, William’s business associates Arnold and Jane, his housekeeper Mrs Ball, his bandleader Billy Two Hats, his cousin and solicitor Nicholas, Mary’s mother Molly, her ex husband Reuben, her ex boyfriend Rick, and her midwife associate Doris. William is an undertaker and Mary a midwife; according to Mary, they “complete the circle … I see them into the world and you see them out”. Subplots regularly involve their work with clients. William is also an avid musician, singing in a choir and playing in a band, and music figures prominently in the production.

All episodes are written by Mick Ford and produced by Trevor Hopkins.

Series 1 (2003)

Series 2 (2004)

Series 3 (2005)

Awards 
 BAFTA Awards
2004 Nominated, BAFTA TV Award 
Best Drama Series
Trevor Hopkins, Stuart Orme, Mick Ford
 
 British Comedy Awards
2003 Nominated, British Comedy Award 
Best TV Comedy Actor
Martin Clunes
Also for The Booze Cruise.
 
 National Television Awards, UK
2005
Nominated, National Television Award 
Most Popular Actor
Martin Clunes
Also for Doc Martin
 
2003
Nominated, National Television Award 
Most Popular Actor
Martin Clunes

References

External links
 
 
 Full cast

2003 British television series debuts
2005 British television series endings
2000s British comedy television series
2000s British drama television series
ITV comedy
ITV television dramas
Mary II of England
Television series by ITV Studios
Television shows produced by Meridian Broadcasting
English-language television shows
2000s British romance television series